Oakland Township may refer to:

Canada
 Oakland Township, Ontario, now part of Brant

United States

Illinois
 Oakland Township, Schuyler County, Illinois

Iowa
 Oakfield Township, Audubon County, Iowa
 Oakland Township, Franklin County, Iowa
 Oakland Township, Louisa County, Iowa

Kansas
 Oakland Township, Clay County, Kansas
 Oakland Township, Cloud County, Kansas

Michigan
 Oakland Charter Township, Michigan

Minnesota
 Oakland Township, Freeborn County, Minnesota
 Oakland Township, Mahnomen County, Minnesota

Nebraska
 Oakland Township, Burt County, Nebraska

North Carolina
 Oakland Township, Chatham County, North Carolina, in Chatham County, North Carolina

North Dakota
 Oakland Township, Mountrail County, North Dakota, in Mountrail County, North Dakota

Pennsylvania
 Oakland Township, Butler County, Pennsylvania
 Oakland Township, Susquehanna County, Pennsylvania
 Oakland Township, Venango County, Pennsylvania

Township name disambiguation pages